János Dosztály (18 February 1920 – 22 March 1998) was a Hungarian sports shooter. He competed at the 1952 Summer Olympics and 1960 Summer Olympics.

References

External links
 

1920 births
1998 deaths
Hungarian male sport shooters
Olympic shooters of Hungary
Shooters at the 1952 Summer Olympics
Shooters at the 1960 Summer Olympics
Sportspeople from Pest County
20th-century Hungarian people